Salvador Rodríguez Morales (born 6 August 2001) is a Mexican professional footballer who plays as a full-back for Liga de Expansión MX club Raya2, on loan from Mazatlán.

Career statistics

Club

References

External links
 
 
 

Living people
2001 births
Association football defenders
Liga MX players
Mazatlán F.C. footballers
Footballers from Michoacán
Mexican footballers
Sportspeople from Morelia
Raya2 Expansión players